SGPS can mean:

 S-GPS, simultaneous GPS
 School of Graduate and Postdoctoral Studies (disambiguation)
 Sociedade Gestora de Participações Sociais (holding company), a type of legal entity in Portugal
 Society of Graduate and Professional Students at Queen's University at Kingston